Platylomia is a genus of cicadas from Southeast Asia.

Species
The following are included in BioLib.cz:<ref name=Biolib>BioLib.cz: Platylomia Stål, 1870 (retrieved 16 March 2022)</ref>
 Platylomia amicta (Distant, 1889)
 Platylomia bivocalis (Matsumura, 1907)
 Platylomia bocki (Distant, 1882)
 Platylomia brevis Distant, 1912
 Platylomia duffelsi Pham & Constant, 2014
 Platylomia ficulnea (Distant, 1892)
 Platylomia flavida (Guérin-Méneville, 1834) - type species (as Cicada flavida Guérin-Méneville, 1834; locality Java and Sumatra) 
 Platylomia insignis Distant, 1912
 Platylomia kohimaensis Hajong & Limatemjen, 2021
 Platylomia larus (Walker, 1858)
 Platylomia lemoultii Lallemand, 1924
 Platylomia malickyi Beuk, 1998
 Platylomia operculata Distant, 1913
 Platylomia pendleburyi Moulton, 1923
 Platylomia pieli Kato, 1938
 Platylomia plana Lei & Li, 1994
 Platylomia radha (Distant, 1881)
 Platylomia shaanxiensis Wang & Wei, 2014
 Platylomia stasserae Boulard, 2005
 Platylomia strongata Lei, 1997
 Platylomia vibrans (Walker, 1850)

Note A number of species have been moved to the genus Champaka including:Platylomia spinosa (Fabricius, 1787)Platylomia virescens Distant, 1905Platylomia viridimaculata (Distant, 1889)Platylomia wallacei'' Beuk, 1999

References

External links

Hemiptera of Asia
Taxa named by Carl Stål
Dundubiini
Cicadidae genera